Sun Linlin (born October 3, 1988 in Dandong) is a Chinese female short track speed skater.

References

External links
 Sun Linlin's profile, from http://www.vancouver2010.com; retrieved 2010-02-24.

1988 births
Living people
Sportspeople from Dandong
Chinese female speed skaters
Chinese female short track speed skaters
Olympic short track speed skaters of China
Olympic medalists in short track speed skating
Olympic gold medalists for China
Short track speed skaters at the 2010 Winter Olympics
Medalists at the 2010 Winter Olympics
Universiade medalists in short track speed skating
Universiade bronze medalists for China
Competitors at the 2007 Winter Universiade
Competitors at the 2009 Winter Universiade
20th-century Chinese women
21st-century Chinese women